William Henry Smith, 3rd Viscount Hambleden (25 July 1903 – 31 March 1948), was a British peer and descendant of the founders of stationery group W H Smith.

Early life and career
Lord Hambleden was the 2nd child and eldest son of Frederick Smith and Esther Georgiana Caroline nee Gore (1870–1955), a daughter of Arthur Gore, 5th Earl of Arran.  He was educated at Eton College and New College, Oxford.

After his father's death in 1928, the family business, W H Smith, was reconstituted as a limited company, in which Smith owned all the ordinary shares and was chairman.  On his death in 1948, the death duties were so severe that a public holding company had to be formed and shares sold to W H Smith staff and the public. His younger brother, David John Smith, remained chairman until 1972, but the Smith family's control slipped away, and the last family member left the board in 1996.

Marriage and family
His wife, Patricia Smith, Viscountess Hambleden was a Lady of the Bedchamber to HM Queen Elizabeth, later the Queen Mother. Patricia, Viscountess Hambleden, was appointed Dame Commander of the Royal Victorian Order (DCVO), and, years later, to Dame Grand Cross of the Royal Victorian Order (GCVO). The couple had five children:
William Herbert Smith (1930–2012)
Laura Caroline Beatrice Smith (1931–2000). Her son, Charles Brand (b. 1954) is a godson of Princess Margaret.
Katharine Patricia Smith (1933–2002). Her son, Patrick Moffatt (b. 1968) is also a godson of Princess Margaret.
Richard Edward Smith (1937–2014)
Philip Reginald Smith (b. 1945)

In 1961 his daughter, Katharine Smith, married the screenwriter Ivan Moffat, with whom she had two sons, Jonathan (born 1964) and Patrick Moffat (born 1968). The marriage was dissolved in 1972, and she married Peter Townend in 1973. 

He succeeded to the title of Viscount Hambleden following his father's death in 1928. He was succeeded by his eldest son, William Herbert.

See also

1903 births
1948 deaths
Alumni of New College, Oxford
People educated at Eton College
Viscounts in the Peerage of the United Kingdom